Emily J. Harman (born June 15, 1991) is an American former professional tennis player.

Harman has won two doubles titles on the ITF Circuit in her career. On October 15, 2012, she reached her best singles ranking of world No. 966. On November 4, 2013, she peaked at No. 232 in the doubles rankings.

Harman made her WTA Tour debut at the 2012 Family Circle Cup, partnering Simone Kalhorn in doubles. The pair lost their first-round match against Klaudia Jans-Ignacik and Alla Kudryavtseva. Later that year, Harman partnered Kalhorn again at the Texas Open, losing to the second seeds Irina-Camelia Begu and Alizé Cornet.

ITF finals

Doubles (2–4)

References

External links
 
 

1991 births
Living people
People from Winchester, Virginia
American female tennis players
Tennis people from Virginia
21st-century American women